Garry Kitchen's GameMaker is an integrated development environment for the Commodore 64, Apple II, and IBM PCs, created by Garry Kitchen and released by Activision in 1985. It is one of the earliest all-in-one game design products aimed at the general consumer, preceded by Broderbund’s The Arcade Machine in 1982. Several sample files are included: a demo sequence featuring animated sprites and music, a recreation of Pitfall!, and a birthday greeting.

Two add-on disks are available for the Commodore 64 version: Sports, and Science Fiction. These include sprites, music, and background elements for loading into GameMaker.

Construction 

GameMaker is divided into five tools, each of which consists of a graphical interface controlled with the joystick:

 SceneMaker - for creating background graphics
 SpriteMaker - for creating movable objects (i.e., sprites)
 MusicMaker - for composing musical scores
 SoundMaker - for creating sound effects
 The Editor - for programming the actual game

The programming language used by GameMaker is reminiscent of other early programming languages like BASIC, but with several proprietary and tightly integrated graphics and sound facilities.

Rather than enter the language via keyboard, GameMaker uses a novel contextual menu-based system. The user selects possible instructions, and then customizes the active objects of the instruction, such as variable names or numbers.

Limitations 

Some limitations of Gamemaker are imposed by the Commodore 64 architecture, and some by the software itself:

 Only eight sprites may be displayed at once (a C64 limit)
 Each sprite and background may have a maximum of four colors, out of a palette of sixteen (a C64 limit)
 Only two stationary background screens may be employed per game (a GameMaker limit)
 Only 3553 total bytes are available for game resources — including sounds, music, sprites, and code (a GameMaker limit)
 The games themselves may not access the disk (a GameMaker limit)

Reception
Computer Gaming World called GameMaker "excellent". COMPUTE's! Gazette called it "a thorough, complete package that makes it relatively easy to design arcade games that actually work."

See also 
 The Arcade Machine (1982)
 Pinball Construction Set (1983)
 Adventure Construction Set (1985)
 Shoot'Em-Up Construction Kit (1987)
 Arcade Game Construction Kit (1988)

References

External links 
 Official GameMaker site
 The GameBase64 Collection, a compendium of user-created games

1985 software
Activision
Apple II software
Commodore 64 software
DOS software
Video game development software
Video game IDE